The acronym NYFA can refer to:

 New York Film Academy
 National Youth Film Academy
 New York Foundation for the Arts